Dipendra Jha is the first and incumbent chief attorney of Madhesh Province, one of seven provinces of Nepal. He assumed the office in February 2018. He is the legal adviser to the Chief Minister Lalbabu Raut and the Convener of Bill Drafting Facilitation Committee in Madhesh Province. Article 160 (5) of the Constitution stipulates: "The Chief Attorney shall be the chief legal advisor to the State Government. It shall be the duty of the Chief Attorney to give opinions and advices on constitutional and legal matters to the State Government and such other authorities as the State Government may specify."

Education 
He has obtained a Masters of Arts (Human Rights) degree from Mahidol University in Thailand and a master's degree in Peace and Conflict studies from Bradford University in the U.K., as well as a Bachelor of Arts (Political Science and English Literature), L.L.B. and L.L.M. from the Tribhuvan University in Nepal. He was awarded with International Visitors Leadership Program (IVLP) by the United States of America in 2014.

Career

Chief Attorney 
As the Chief Attorney, he has contributed and led to the enactment of several laws and policies for the Province 2 government, including Dalit Empowerment Act, State 2 Police Act, State 2 Civil Service Act, Jan Lokpal Act, Girls’ Protection Special Act.

Lawyer 
Before he became Chief Attorney on 18 February 2018, he practiced law at the Supreme Court of Nepal. He was involved in a number of public interest litigation (PIL) cases on various key issues such as citizenship, inclusion, federalism and constitutional issues in Nepal.

As a constitution lawyer, his litigation has contributed to ensuring federalism in Nepal in The Constitution of Nepal 2015. The Supreme Court of Nepal, on 20 June 2015 issued an interim order against the implementation of a 16-point agreement that was agreed upon amongst the four major parties - Nepali Congress, CPN-UML, CPN-Maoist, and Nepal Democratic Forum - on 8 June 2015 to promulgate the constitution without federalism.

Although The Constitution of Nepal 2015 - which is the first constitution of the country drafted through people's elected representatives - was claimed the best constitution in the world by many, his interviews and writings consistently lent to the idea that the document is controversial and that it should be amended. In an interview with BBC media, translated and transcribed by Nepali Timesm he writes: “Halt constitution-drafting' Advocate Dipendra Jha with Rabindra Mishra in BBC Nepali Service, 9 September"

He has been quoted and mentioned in several news reports and interview of several media, including Al Zajeera English, AFP news  The Kathmandu Post, The Himalayan Times, Hindustan Times, The Times of India etc. on contemporary politics and constitutional and social justice issues of Nepal.

Human Rights Defender 
He is a prominent human rights defender voicing the human rights concerns of the marginalised communities. He is the founder of Terai Human Rights Defenders Alliance (commonly known as THRD Alliance), which is an independent and active human rights non-government organization.

Author 
He is the author of Federal Nepal: Trials and Tribulations, which narrates the story of the constitution making process of Nepal. The book review published in The Record read: "Asides from facts and figures on the marginalized, his book has anecdotes and reviews of key political events, and includes the reactions of various Nepali power-centers and the international community towards Nepal’s constitution."

As author, he also wrote Op-Ed on current affairs of politics, constitution, human rights, rule of law and democracy for The Kathmandu Post and its sister publication Kantipur in Nepali language and other online news portals, including Online Khabar and Setopati.

Political career 
He resigned from the post of Chief Attorney of Madhesh Province on  September 3, 2022 and joined Janta Samajwadi Party lead by Upendra Yadav. He started campaign to contest for Member of Parliament from Mahottari 3 (constituency). But just a day before nomination his ticket was converted to Member Of Legislative Assembly of Mahottari 3 (1). He fought with Abhiram Sharma from LOSAPA and got defeated from 174 votes margin receiving 9,718 where as Abhiram Sharma received 9,892 votes. Jha moved back to Kathmandu for his legal practice and to continue his political career.

Personal life 

He married Anu Jha in 2004. They have two daughters Diya Jha and Aradhya Jha. He and his spouse are from Mahottari District.

References 

21st-century Nepalese lawyers
Nepalese human rights activists
Dipendra Jha
Alumni of the University of Bradford
Living people
1979 births